George O'Hanlon (November 23, 1912 – February 11, 1989) was an American actor and writer. He was best known for his role as Joe McDoakes in the Warner Bros.' live-action Joe McDoakes short subjects from 1942 to 1956 and as the voice of George Jetson in Hanna-Barbera's 1962 prime-time animated television series The Jetsons and its 1985 revival.

Early life
George O'Hanlon was born on November 23, 1912, in Brooklyn, New York.

Career

Film
From the early 1940s, O'Hanlon was a character actor in feature films, usually playing the hero's streetwise, cynical friend. He appeared in features for various studios while continuing the Joe McDoakes role for Warner Bros. After the McDoakes series lapsed in 1956, O'Hanlon returned to character work, mostly in television (two rare post-McDoakes movie appearances are in Bop Girl Goes Calypso and Kronos, both from 1957).

Television
In the 1953–54 season, O'Hanlon appeared several times on NBC's The Dennis Day Show. In 1957, he played Charlie Appleby on an I Love Lucy episode, "Lucy and Superman". O’Hanlon played a character listed as “Caldwell” in a 1958 episode of Maverick, entitled “Rope of Cards”, S1 E17.  In 1958, O'Hanlon played a New York publicist for a fashion model, Loco Jones (Barbara Eden) in the syndicated romantic comedy How to Marry a Millionaire.

In 1962–63, he voiced one of his most prominent characters, George Jetson in the original The Jetsons, a role he would reprise over 20 years later in two additional seasons from 1985 to 1987.

In the autumn of 1964, he appeared as a cab driver in the 13-episode CBS drama The Reporter starring Harry Guardino. In 1966, O'Hanlon appeared opposite Jackie Gleason as Ralph Kramden's loudmouthed "bum brother-in-law", on Gleason's first TV show of the 1966-67 season. He also made various appearances on ABC's Love, American Style, a series for which he wrote the teleplays and also directed several episodes.

In 1971, O'Hanlon appeared as a bear trainer on The Partridge Family, season 2, episode 6, "Whatever Happened to Moby Dick?", a drunk in The Odd Couple, season 2, episode 6, "Murray the Fink" and a drunk in Adam-12, season 4 episode 1, "Extortion".

Writer
Apart from acting, he wrote screenplays and also wrote the storyboard for nearly all of the Joe McDoakes shorts. He wrote stories for television series in the 1960s such as Petticoat Junction, 77 Sunset Strip, and wrote episodes for Hanna-Barbera's The Flintstones. He also auditioned for the role of Fred Flintstone, but lost to Alan Reed; however, he was remembered when it was time to cast The Jetsons and Morey Amsterdam, the original choice to voice the lead male role, was unavailable due to sponsor conflicts. He once said: "George Jetson is an average man, he has trouble with his boss, he has problems with his kids, and so on. The only difference is that he lives in the next century."

Personal life
O'Hanlon was married to Inez Witt from 1932 to 1948. After divorcing her, he married actress Martha Stewart in 1949; they divorced in 1952. In 1953, O'Hanlon married actress Nancy Owens; they had two children (actor George O'Hanlon Jr., and daughter Laurie O'Hanlon, a registered nurse). They remained married until his death.

Death
In the mid-1980s, Hanna-Barbera revived The Jetsons and brought back its original voice cast of O'Hanlon, Daws Butler, Mel Blanc, Don Messick, Penny Singleton, Jean Vander Pyl, and Janet Waldo. O'Hanlon had suffered a stroke and was blind and suffering from limited mobility. He recorded his dialogue in a separate session from the other cast members by having all lines read to him by the recording director Gordon Hunt and then recited one at a time.

On February 11, 1989, just after recording dialogue for Jetsons: The Movie, O'Hanlon complained of a headache and was taken to Saint Joseph's Hospital in Burbank, California, where he died of a second stroke. According to Andrea Romano, who was Hanna-Barbera's casting director at the time, O'Hanlon found it difficult to read and hear, and in the end, he died doing what he loved. The film was dedicated to him, along with Jetsons co-star Mel Blanc who died nearly five months later.  Jeff Bergman was hired to finish the remaining dialogue for both actors for the movie.

O'Hanlon was cremated, and his ashes were scattered in Pierce Brothers Valley Oaks Cemetery in Westlake Village, California.

Filmography

Film

Television

Production work

References

External links

1912 births
1989 deaths
American male film actors
American male television actors
20th-century American male actors
American male voice actors
American television writers
American male television writers
People from Brooklyn
Male actors from New York City
Hanna-Barbera people
Burials at Valley Oaks Memorial Park
Screenwriters from New York (state)
20th-century American screenwriters
20th-century American male writers